David Shepherd, Shepard, or Sheppard may refer to:

Sportsmen
 David Sheppard (1929–2005), England cricket captain and later Bishop of Liverpool
 Dave Sheppard (1931–2000), American Olympic weightlifter
 David Shepherd (rugby union) (1936–2003), English rugby union player for Australia
 David Shepherd (umpire) (1940–2009), English cricket umpire
 David Shepherd (sportsman) (born 1956), Australian sportsman who played VFL football with St Kilda and cricket for Victoria
 David Shepard (cricketer) (born 1970), Australian cricketer

Other people
 David Alroy, 12th-century Jewish pseudo-Messiah.
 David Shepard (surgeon) (1744–1818), American doctor and soldier
 David H. Shepard (1923–2007), American inventor
 David Shepherd (producer) (1924–2018), American producer, director, and actor
 David Shepherd (artist) (1931–2017), British artist
 David Shepard (film preservationist) (1940–2017), American film preservationist
 David Shepard (politician) (1947–2021), American politician, former Democratic member of the Tennessee House of Representatives
 David Shepherd (Canadian politician) (born 1973 or 1974), Canadian politician, Alberta MLA
 David Sheppard (broadcaster) (born 1981), British radio presenter

Fictional characters
 David Shepherd, primary protagonist of the 2009 American television series Kings